Zhejiang Sci-Tech University (ZSTU) is a university in Zhejiang province that provides programs in the fields of engineering, sciences, humanities (arts), economics, management and law with engineering being its main focus. It is run jointly by Ministry of Education and the Zhejiang provincial government, the latter being the main administrative body.

Campus 

ZSTU is in Hangzhou and has two campuses, covering a total area of 1,500 mu.

History

The history of ZSTU dates back to the Sericultural Academy, which was founded in 1897 and was one of the earliest modern educational institutions in China. The school began to enroll undergraduate students in 1959 and graduate students in 1979. It acquired the right to confer master's degrees in 1983 and was granted the right by Ministry of Education to appraise the qualifications of teachers applying for the title of associate professor in 1993.

In 1995, it started to offer PhD programs in collaboration with Zhejiang University. The same year saw the first international enrollments and the enrollment of students from Hong Kong, Macao and Taiwan. In 1999, it began to confer master's degrees to on-the-job students who are of the equivalent education level. In 2001, it was granted the right to confer master's degrees to engineering students. In 2003 it was approved as an institution qualified to provide joint PhD programs and in 2006 it got the right to confer Doctoral degree.

ZSTU now has graduate programs, undergraduate programs and adult education, the latter in the form of public education, non-governmental education and education through international cooperation.

In April 1999 the institution changed its name from Zhejiang Institute of Silk Textile to Zhejiang Institute of Science and Technology. In May 2004, ZIST was renamed to Zhejiang Sci-Tech University (ZSTU).

Administration

Schools and departments

ZSTU consists of 16 schools or faculties (departments):
 School of Sciences 
 Silk Institute, College of Materials and Textiles
 School of Fashion Design and Engineering 
 School of Information Science and Technology
 Faculty of Mechanical Engineering and Automation
 School of Civil Engineering and Architecture
 College of Life Science and Medicine
 School of Art and Design
 School of Economics and Management
 School of Law and Politics
 College of Foreign Languages
 Shi Liangcai School of Journalism and Communication
 School of Marxism
 Qixin School
 School of Continuing Education 
 Keyi College of Zhejiang Sci-Tech University
 Department of Physical Education

It owns one independent college on another campus. Two of its disciplines are regarded by the province as very important, and eight are key disciplines at provincial or ministerial level. It has one key laboratory of the Ministry of Education and two key laboratories of the Zhejiang Province. The school offers 45 undergraduate programs, of which six are provincial key programs.

It confers Doctoral degree in two disciplines, Master's degrees in four first-level disciplines and 30 second-level disciplines (sub-disciplines), and it provides one joint Doctoral program and two Master's programs in engineering.

The school has two pilot centers for teaching basic courses in Zhejiang Province, two provincial engineering centers, six R&D centers and more than 40 school labs and institutes of excellence.

Students
At present, the number of full-time undergraduate and graduate students enrolled at ZSTU is 23,500; an additional 3500 students are in programs of adult education and further education.

Rankings 

In 2020, Academic Ranking of World Universities ranked Zhejiang Sci-Tech university within the 901-1000 band globally.

Library 
In recent years, the school's required enrollment score has been among the highest of the HELs in Zhejiang province - as has been the employment rate of its students.

Awards 
ZSTU has won over 120 research awards, among which three are national — two second awards of the National Scientific and Technological Invention Award and one second award of the National Scientific and Technological Progress Award — and over 20 are provincial or ministerial.

It has research funds of more than 110 million yuan.

References

External links

 Zhejiang Sci-Tech University 

 
Universities and colleges in Zhejiang
Educational institutions established in 1897
Technical universities and colleges in China
1897 establishments in China